Doudeauville may refer to several communes in France:

 Doudeauville, Pas-de-Calais
 Doudeauville, Seine-Maritime
Doudeauville-en-Vexin, in the Eure département